Florenciella lugubris is a species of deepwater cardinalfish native to the Indian Ocean, where it is found at depths from . This species is the only known member of its genus.

References

Epigonidae
Fish described in 1965